Sunnyside, also known as Sunnyside Farms, is a historic farm complex and national historic district located at Washington, Rappahannock County, Virginia. It encompasses 13 contributing buildings, 3 contributing sites, and 2 contributing structures.  The main house was constructed in four distinct building phases from about 1785 to 1996.  The oldest section is a two-story single-pile log structure with a hall-parlor plan, with a 1 1/2-story stone kitchen added about 1800. In addition to the main house, the remaining contributing resources include five dwellings (one of which is a stone slave quarters), two smokehouses, a root cellar, a chicken coop, a spring house, two cemeteries, a silo, a workshop, a stone foundation for a demolished house, stone walls, and a shed. The farm is the location of the first commercial apple orchard in Rappahannock County, Virginia, established in 1873.

It was added to the National Register of Historic Places in 2004.

References

Washington, Virginia
Historic districts in Rappahannock County, Virginia
Historic districts on the National Register of Historic Places in Virginia
National Register of Historic Places in Rappahannock County, Virginia
Farms on the National Register of Historic Places in Virginia
Slave cabins and quarters in the United States